Neil Seery (born 30 August 1979) is a retired Irish professional mixed martial artist, who most recently competed in the flyweight division of the UFC. Beginning his career in 2005, Seery also competed for BAMMA, Cage Warriors, and RINGS. He was the Cage Warriors Flyweight Champion.

Mixed martial arts career

Early career
Seery made his professional debut in 2005 and after starting off his career at 1–4, Seery was able to bounce back, compiling a record of 8–8 before he began competing for the Cage Warriors promotion in his home country of Ireland. Under the promotion's banner, Seery went 5–1, capturing the Flyweight Championship in the process.

Ultimate Fighting Championship
Seery made his UFC debut at UFC Fight Night 37 on 8 March 2014 as a replacement for Ian McCall against Brad Pickett, and was signed to a four-fight contract. A huge underdog against Pickett, Seery lost unanimously on the judges' score cards.

In his second fight for the promotion, Seery faced Phil Harris at UFC Fight Night 46 on 19 July 2014. This was a rematch of Seery's fight with Harris at BAMMA 3, which Seery lost via unanimous decision. He won the fight by unanimous decision.

Seery was expected to face Richie Vaculik at UFC Fight Night 55 on 8 November 2014.  Subsequently, Seery pulled out of the fight and was replaced by Louis Smolka.

Seery faced Chris Beal on 24 January 2015 at UFC on Fox 14. He won the back-and-forth fight by unanimous decision.

Seery faced Louis Smolka on 11 July 2015 at UFC 189. He lost the fight by unanimous decision.

Seery faced Jon Delos Reyes on 24 October 2016 at UFC Fight Night 76.  He won the fight via submission in the second round. The victory also produced a Performance of the Night bonus.

Seery next faced Kyoji Horiguchi on 8 May 2016 at UFC Fight Night 87. He lost the fight via unanimous decision.

Seery was expected to face Ian McCall on 19 November 2016 at UFC Fight Night 99. However, as Seery was weighing in for the event, it was announced that McCall had to pull out of the fight after becoming ill due to the effects of his weight cut and the bout was scrapped.

Seery faced Alexandre Pantoja at UFC Fight Night 113 on July 16 2017. He lost the fight via submission in the third round. Seery confirmed his intention to retire from MMA competition after this fight.

Championships and accomplishments
Cage Warriors
Cage Warriors Flyweight Championship (One time)
Ultimate Fighting Championship
Performance of the Night (One time)

Mixed martial arts record

|-
|Loss
|align=center|16–13
|Alexandre Pantoja
|Submission (rear-naked choke)
|UFC Fight Night: Nelson vs. Ponzinibbio 
|
|align=center|3
|align=center|2:31
|Glasgow, Scotland
|
|-
|Loss
|align=center|16–12
|Kyoji Horiguchi
|Decision (unanimous)
|UFC Fight Night: Overeem vs. Arlovski
|
|align=center|3
|align=center|5:00
|Rotterdam, Netherlands
|
|-
|Win
|align=center|16–11
|Jon delos Reyes
|Submission (guillotine choke)
|UFC Fight Night: Holohan vs. Smolka
|
|align=center|2
|align=center|4:12
|Dublin, Ireland
|
|-
|Loss
|align=center|15–11
|Louis Smolka
|Decision (unanimous)
|UFC 189 
|
|align=center|3
|align=center|5:00
|Las Vegas, Nevada, United States
|
|-
| Win
| align=center| 15–10
| Chris Beal
| Decision (unanimous)
| UFC on Fox: Gustafsson vs. Johnson
| 
| align=center| 3
| align=center| 5:00
| Stockholm, Sweden
| 
|-
| Win
| align=center| 14–10
| Phil Harris
| Decision (unanimous)
| UFC Fight Night: McGregor vs. Brandao
| 
| align=center| 3
| align=center| 5:00
| Dublin, Ireland
| 
|-
| Loss
| align=center| 13–10
| Brad Pickett
| Decision (unanimous)
| UFC Fight Night: Gustafsson vs. Manuwa
| 
| align=center| 3
| align=center| 5:00
| London, England
| 
|-
| Win
| align=center| 13–9
| Mikael Silander
| Submission (armbar)
| CWFC 55
| 
| align=center| 3
| align=center| 3:57
| Dublin, Ireland
| 
|-
| Win
| align=center| 12–9
| Paul Marin
| TKO (body kick)
| CWFC 53
| 
| align=center| 1
| align=center| 1:22
| Glasgow, Scotland
| 
|-
| Win
| align=center| 11–9
| Karl Harrison
| Decision (unanimous)
| Cage Warriors: 49
| 
| align=center| 3
| align=center| 5:00
| Cardiff, Wales
| 
|-
| Win
| align=center| 10–9
| Mark Platts
| Submission (rear-naked choke)
| Cage Warriors: 47
| 
| align=center| 2
| align=center| 2:46
| Dublin, Ireland
| 
|-
| Loss
| align=center| 9–9
| Artemij Sitenkov
| Submission (kneebar)
|  Cage Warriors: 46
| 
| align=center| 1
| align=center| 0:55
| Kyiv, Ukraine
| 
|-
| Win
| align=center| 9–8
| Niko Gjoka
| KO (punches)
| Cage Warriors: 44
| 
| align=center| 2
| align=center| 4:04
| Kentish Town, England
| 
|-
| Win
| align=center| 8–8
| Damien Rooney
| Decision (unanimous)
| CC 7: Fields vs. Kelly
| 
| align=center| 3
| align=center| 5:00
| Belfast, Northern Ireland
| 
|-
| Loss
| align=center| 7–8
| Phil Harris
| Decision (unanimous)
| BAMMA 3
| 
| align=center| 3
| align=center| 5:00
| Birmingham, England
| 
|-
| Loss
| align=center| 7–7
| Jordy Peute
| Submission (kneebar)
| CW 12: Nightmare
| 
| align=center| 2
| align=center| 0:17
| Belfast, Northern Ireland
| 
|-
| Win
| align=center| 7–6
| Erikas Suslovas
| Submission (armbar)
| Bushido Lithuania: Hero's 2009
| 
| align=center| 1
| align=center| 0:29
| Vilnius, Lithuania
| 
|-
| Win
| align=center| 6–6
| Neil McLeod
| Submission (armbar)
| EB: Extreme Brawl
| 
| align=center| 3
| align=center| 1:02
| London, England
| 
|-
| Win
| align=center| 5–6
| Neil McLeod
| TKO (punches)
| EB: Extreme Brawl
| 
| align=center| 2
| align=center| 4:57
| London, England
| 
|-
| Loss
| align=center| 4–6
| James Doolan
| Submission (triangle choke)
| SAS 9: Strike and Submit 9
| 
| align=center| 1
| align=center| 1:59
| Gateshead, England
| 
|-
| Loss
| align=center| 4–5
| Andreas Lovbrand
| TKO (knee injury)
| TW: Tribal Warfare
| 
| align=center| 3
| align=center| N/A
| Galway, Ireland
| 
|-
| Win
| align=center| 4–4
| Peter Wilson
| TKO (punches)
| UFR 14: Ultimate Fighting Revolution 14
| 
| align=center| 2
| align=center| N/A
| Belfast, Northern Ireland
| 
|-
| Win
| align=center| 3–4
| Steve McCombe
| Submission (rear-naked choke)
| UFR 13: Ultimate Fighting Revolution 13
| 
| align=center| 2
| align=center| 4:56
| Lurgan, Northern Ireland
| 
|-
| Win
| align=center| 2–4
| Husen Muhamed
| TKO (punches)
| COT 2: Cage of Truth 
| 
| align=center| 2
| align=center| N/A
| Dublin, Ireland
| 
|-
| Loss
| align=center| 1–4
| Andreas Lovbrand
| Decision (split)
| UFR 10: Ultimate Fighting Revolution 10
| 
| align=center| 3
| align=center| 5:00
| Galway, Ireland
| 
|-
| Loss
| align=center| 1–3
| Paul McVeigh
| Submission (rear-naked choke)
| Cage Rage Contenders: The Real Deal
| 
| align=center| 1
| align=center| 1:10
| Dublin, Ireland
| 
|-
| Win
| align=center| 1–2
| Steve McCombe
| TKO (punches)
| ROT: Ring of Truth 6
| 
| align=center| 1
| align=center| 4:25
| Dublin, Ireland
| 
|-
| Loss
| align=center| 0–2
| Micky Young
| DQ (soccer kick)
| ROT: Ring of Truth 4
| 
| align=center| 1
| align=center| N/A
| Dublin, Ireland
| 
|-
| Loss
| align=center| 0–1
| Michael Leonard
| Submission (triangle choke)
| RINGS Ireland: Reborn
| 
| align=center| N/A
| align=center| N/A
| Dublin, Ireland
|

See also
 List of Irish UFC fighters
 List of current UFC fighters
 List of male mixed martial artists

References

External links
 
 

Living people
1979 births
Irish male mixed martial artists
Flyweight mixed martial artists
Mixed martial artists utilizing karate
Mixed martial artists utilizing Brazilian jiu-jitsu
Sportspeople from Dublin (city)
Irish male karateka
Irish practitioners of Brazilian jiu-jitsu
Ultimate Fighting Championship male fighters